The Manicouagan or Manicuagan River, often clipped to Manic, is a river in Côte-Nord region of Quebec, Canada. The reservoir, also known as Lake Manicouagan, lies within the remnant of an ancient eroded impact crater (astrobleme). The Manicouagan impact structure is the sixth-largest confirmed impact crater known on earth.

Name
The river's name is believed to come from a Montagnais name meaning "Place where Tree Bark is Found". However the Innu of Betsiamites call it Menukuanistuk Shipu, meaning "River of the Cup".

Tributaries
The major tributaries of the Manicouagan River are in upstream order:
 Toulnustouc River
 Isoukustouc River
 Fontmarais River
 Lemay River
 Manicouagan Reservoir
 Mouchalagane River
 Seignelay River
 Hart Jaune River
 Themines River
 Petite Riviere Manicouagan

History

At the end of August 1535, Jacques Cartier, while sailing south, noted the mouth of this large river but gave it no name.  In June 1664, Jesuit Henri Nouvel was the first missionary to travel upstream of the "Grand Manikouaganistikou River that the French call rivière Noire because of its depth". The next year, he "returned to the mouth of the Manicoüagan in June." The river's spelling has remained fairly constant from then on.

In the early 1950s, the Manicouagan River attracted Hydro-Québec's attention for hydro-electric development because of the deep and fast running waters. In 1956, a dam was built at the mouth of Lake Sainte-Anne to regulate the Toulnustouc River, the main left tributary that empties in the Manicouagan between the Manic-2 and Manic-3 dams. Four years later, the main construction work began on the dams and power stations of the Manicouagan River and its neighbor to the west, the Outardes River. By 1978, this project, with a total power supply 4672 MW, was completed.

Hydro-electric dams
There are a number of hydroelectric power plants on the Manicouagan, part of the Manic-Outardes Project:
 McCormick generating station - 335 MW, owned by Hydro-Québec and Alcoa.
 Manic 1 generating station - 184 MW, operated by Hydro-Québec.
 Jean-Lesage generating station, formerly Manic-2 Power Station - 1024 MW, operated by Hydro-Québec.
 René-Lévesque generating station, formerly Manic-3 Power Station - 1244 MW, operated by Hydro-Québec.
 Manic 4 - Abandoned project
 Daniel-Johnson Dam:
 Manic-5 generating station - 1592 MW, operated by Hydro-Québec.
 Manic-5-PA generating station - 1064 MW, operated by Hydro-Québec.

References

External links

Hydro-Québec Manicouagan map

Manicouagan-Outardes hydroelectric project
Rivers of Côte-Nord
Tributaries of the Saint Lawrence River